Internal Autonomy Day is an official holiday in French Polynesia, an overseas collectivity of France. It is celebrated annually on 29 June, to honor Tahitian and French Polynesian self-rule. The day also marked the annexation of the Kingdom of Tahiti and the turnover of native sovereignty by King Pōmare V to France.

Pro-autonomy political parties celebrate the holiday on 29 June while Oscar Temaru, former President of French Polynesia who advocated independence from France, noted that the day should known as "Mourning Day" instead. 
The date French Polynesia achieved internal autonomy was on 6 September 1984.

The holiday is mainly celebrated in the capital of Papeete, on the island of Tahiti. It is celebrate with parades, entertainment and concert on the waterfront of Papeete.

See also
Missionary Day

References

Annual events in France
June observances
Tahitian culture
French Polynesian culture